Centrolene buckleyi is a species of frog in the family Centrolenidae.
It is found in Colombia, Ecuador, and Peru.
Its natural habitats are subtropical or tropical moist montane forests, subtropical or tropical high-altitude shrubland, subtropical or tropical high-altitude grassland, and rivers. It is becoming rare due to habitat loss.  It is named for the naturalist Samuel Botsford Buckley.

Sources

References

buckleyi
Amphibians of the Andes
Amphibians of Colombia
Amphibians of Ecuador
Amphibians of Peru
Taxonomy articles created by Polbot
Amphibians described in 1882